Body Talk is a 1973 studio album by American guitarist George Benson, released on CTI Records.

Track listing

 Recorded at Van Gelder Studio, Englewood Cliffs, New Jersey on July 17 (Tracks 4–6) and 18 (Tracks 1–3), 1973.

Later releases
This album was reissued on the Super Audio CD format in September 2018 by UK label Dutton Vocalion, remastered in both stereo and surround sound from the original analogue tapes by Michael J.Dutton. The surround sound portion of the disc features the quadraphonic mixes of the album, made available for the first time in over 40 years.

Personnel
 George Benson – lead guitar
 Earl Klugh – rhythm guitar
 Harold Mabern – electric piano
 Ron Carter – acoustic bass
 Gary King – electric bass
 Jack DeJohnette – drums
 Mobutu – percussion, congas
 Frank Foster – tenor saxophone
 Gerald Chamberlain – trombone
 Dick Griffin – trombone
 Jon Faddis – trumpet, flugelhorn
 John Gatchell – trumpet, flugelhorn
 Waymon Reed – trumpet, flugelhorn
 Pee Wee Ellis – arrangements and conductor

Production
 Producer – Creed Taylor
 Engineer – Rudy Van Gelder
 Album Design – Bob Ciano
 Cover Photography – Pete Turner 
 Liner Photography – Steve Salmieri

References

1973 albums
George Benson albums
Albums produced by Creed Taylor
CTI Records albums
Albums recorded at Van Gelder Studio